Pedra Branca (Portuguese, 'white rock') may refer to:

 Pedra Branca (Tasmania), an island in Australia
 Pedra Branca skink, a lizard endemic to Australia
 Pedra Branca, Ceará, a municipality in Brazil
 Pedra Branca do Amapari, a municipality in Brazil
 Pedra Branca, Paraíba, a municipality in Brazil
 Pedra Branca State Park, in Brazil
 Pedra Branca, Singapore, outlying island of Singapore
 Pedra Branca dispute
 Pedrabranca Futebol Clube, also known as Pedrabranca, a Brazilian football club 
 The Sabujá language

See also

 Branca (disambiguation)